Electronic article surveillance (EAS) is a type of system used to prevent shoplifting from retail stores, pilferage of books from libraries, or unwanted removal of properties from office buildings. EAS systems typically consist of two components: EAS antennas and EAS tags or labels. EAS tags are attached to merchandise; these tags can only be removed or deactivated by employees when the item is properly purchased or checked out. If merchandise bearing an active tag passes by an antenna installed at an entrance/exit, an alarm sounds alerting staff that unauthorized merchandise is leaving the store. Some stores also have antennas at entrances to restrooms to deter shoppers from taking unpaid-for merchandise into the restroom.

History
EAS tags that could be attached to items in stores were invented by Arthur Minasy in 1964. He filed a patent for his "Method and Apparatus for Detecting the Unauthorized Movement of Articles" in 1965 with the patent being granted in 1970.

Types
There are several major types of electronic article surveillance systems:
Electro-magnetic, also known as magneto-harmonic or Barkhausen effect
Acousto-magnetic, also known as magnetostrictive
Radio frequency (RFID, 8.2 MHz)
Microwave
Video surveillance systems (to some extent)
Concealed EAS surveillance systems

Concealed EAS systems

These new types of systems have caught on lately as there are no visible pedestals or hindrance in the store facade. These systems are installed below the floor and dropped from the ceiling and can then protect merchandise of retailers from being stolen. There are site conditions and other parameters which enable them to be successfully installed but often it has now been noted that malls insist on concealed system as a mandate to improve the shopping experience.

Electro-magnetic systems

These tags are made of a strip of amorphous metal (metglas) which has a very low magnetic saturation value. Except for permanent tags, this strip is also lined with a strip of ferromagnetic material with a moderate coercive field (magnetic "hardness"). Detection is achieved by sensing harmonics and sum or difference signals generated by the non-linear magnetic response of the material under a mixture of low-frequency (in the 10 Hz to 1000 Hz range) magnetic fields.

When the ferromagnetic material is magnetized, it biases the amorphous metal strip into saturation, where it no longer produces harmonics. Deactivation of these tags is therefore done with magnetization. Activation requires demagnetization.

The EM systems are suitable for libraries to protect books and media. In the retail segment, unlike AM and RF, EM can protect small or round items and products with foil packaging or metal objects, like cosmetics, baby milk cans, medicines, DIY tools, homeware etc. EM systems can also detect objects placed in foil bags or in metal briefcases.

A further application is the Intellectual property (IP) protection against theft: Security paper with embedded microwires, which is used to detect confidential documents if they are removed from a building.

Acousto-magnetic systems

These are similar to magnetic tags in that they are made of two strips: a strip of magnetostrictive, ferromagnetic amorphous metal and a strip of a magnetically semi-hard metallic strip, which is used as a biasing magnet (to increase signal strength) and to allow deactivation. These strips are not bound together but free to oscillate mechanically.

Amorphous metals are used in such systems due to their good magnetoelastic coupling, which implies that they can efficiently convert magnetic energy into mechanical vibrations.

The detectors for such tags emit periodic tonal bursts at about 58 kHz, the same as the resonance frequency of the amorphous strips. This causes the strip to vibrate longitudinally by magnetostriction, and it continues to oscillate after the burst is over. The vibration causes a change in magnetization in the amorphous strip, which induces an AC voltage in the receiver antenna. If this signal meets the required parameters (correct frequency, repetition, etc.), the alarm is activated.

When the semi-hard magnet is magnetized, the tag is activated. The magnetized strip makes the amorphous strip respond much more strongly to the detectors, because the DC magnetic field given off by the strip offsets the magnetic anisotropy within the amorphous metal. The tag can also be deactivated by demagnetizing the strip, making the response small enough so that it will not be detected by the detectors.

AM tags are three dimensional plastic tags, much thicker than electro-magnetic strips and are thus seldom used for books.

Radio frequency (RF) systems

These tags are essentially an LC tank circuit (L for inductor, C for capacitor) that has a resonance peak anywhere from 1.75 MHz to 9.5 MHz. The standard frequency for retail use is 8.2 MHz. Sensing is achieved by sweeping around the resonant frequency and detecting the dip.

Deactivation for 8.2 MHz label tags is typically achieved using a deactivation pad. In the absence of such a device, labels can be rendered inactive by punching a hole, or by covering the circuit with a metallic label, a "detuner". The deactivation pad functions by partially destroying the capacitor. Though this sounds violent, in reality, both the process and the result are unnoticeable to the naked eye. The deactivator causes a micro short circuit in the label. This is done by submitting the tag to a strong electromagnetic field at the resonant frequency, which induces voltages exceeding the capacitor's breakdown voltage.

It also benefits the user in terms of running costs, since the RF de-activator only activates to send a pulse when a circuit is present. Both EM and AM deactivation units are on all the time and consume considerably more electricity. The reliability of "remote" deactivation (i.e. non-contact or non-proximity deactivation) capability makes for a fast and efficient throughput at the checkout.

Efficiency is an important factor when choosing an overall EAS solution given that time lost attempting to deactivate labels can be an important drag of cashier productivity as well as customer satisfaction if unwanted alarms are caused by tags that have not been effectively deactivated at the point of sale.

Deactivation of RF labels is also dependent on the size of the label and the power of the deactivation pad (the larger the label, the greater the field it generates for deactivation to take place. For this reason very small labels can cause issues for consistent deactivation). It is common to find RF deactivation built into barcode flat and vertical scanners at the POS in food retail especially in Europe and Asia where RF EAS technology has been the standard for nearly a decade. In apparel retail deactivation usually takes the form of flat pads of approx. 30x30 cm.

Microwave systems
These permanent tags are made of a non-linear element (a diode) coupled to one microwave and one electrostatic antenna. At the exit, one antenna emits a low-frequency (about 100 kHz) field, and another one emits a microwave field. The tag acts as a mixer re-emitting a combination of signals from both fields. This modulated signal triggers the alarm. These tags are permanent and somewhat costly. They are mostly used in clothing stores and have practically been withdrawn from use.

Source tagging
Source tagging is the application of EAS security tags at the source, the supplier or manufacturer, instead of at the retail side of the chain. For the retailer, source tagging eliminates the labor expense needed to apply the EAS tags themselves, and reduces the time between receipt of merchandise and when the merchandise is ready for sale. For the supplier, the main benefit is the preservation of the retail packaging aesthetics by easing the application of security tags within product packaging. Source tagging allows the EAS tags to be concealed and more difficult to remove.

The high-speed application of EAS labels, suited for commercial packaging processes, was perfected via modifications to standard pressure-sensitive label applicators. Today, consumer goods are source tagged at high speeds with the EAS labels incorporated into the packaging or the product itself.

The most common source tags are AM strips and 8.2 MHz radio frequency labels. Most manufacturers use both when source tagging in the USA. In Europe there is little demand for AM tagging given that the Food and Department Store environments are dominated by RF technology.

Tag pollution
One significant problem from source tagging is something called "tag pollution" caused when non-deactivated tags carried around by customers cause unwanted alarms, decreasing the effectiveness and integrity of the EAS system. The problem is that no store has more than one system. Therefore, if a store actually has an anti-shoplifting system to deactivate a label they will only deactivate the one that is part of their system. If a store does not use an EAS system, they will not deactivate any tags at all.  This is often the reason why people trigger an alarm entering a store, which can cause great frustration for both customers and staff. The problem is most evident in shopping malls where customers wander between stores.

Discussion

Occasional versus professional shoplifters
EAS systems can provide a solid deterrent against casual theft. The occasional shoplifter, not being familiar with these systems and their mode of operation, will either get caught by them, or preferably, will be dissuaded from attempting any theft in the first place.

Informed shoplifters are conscious of how tags can be removed or deactivated. A common method of defeating RF tags is the use of so-called booster bags. These are typically large paper bags that have been lined with multiple layers of aluminium foil to effectively shield the RF label from detection, much like a Faraday cage. A similar situation would be the loss of signal that a cell phone suffers inside an elevator: The electro-magnetic, or radio waves are effectively blocked, reducing the ability to send or receive information.

However, they may miss some tags or be unable to remove or deactivate all of them, especially if concealed or integrated tags are used. As a service to retailers, many manufacturers integrate security tags in the packaging of their products, or even inside the product itself, though this is rare and not especially desirable either for the retailer or the manufacturer. The practical totality of EAS labels are discarded with the product packaging. This is of particular application in everyday items that consumers might carry on their person to avoid the inconvenience of potentially live reactivated EAS tags when walking in and out of retail stores.

Hard tags, typically used for clothing or ink tags, known as benefit denial tags, may reduce the rate of tag manipulation. Also, shoplifters deactivating or detaching tags may be spotted by the shop staff.

Shoplifting tools are illegal in many jurisdictions, and can, in any case, serve as evidence against the perpetrators. Hence, informed shoplifters, although they decrease their risk of being caught by the EAS, expose themselves to much greater judicial risks if they get caught with tools, booster bags, or while trying to remove tags, as this shows intent to steal.

The possession of shoplifting tools (e.g. lined bags or wire cutters to cut bottle tags) can lead to the suspect being arrested for suspicion of theft or "Going equipped for stealing, etc." within the UK judicial system.

In summary, while even the least expensive EAS systems will catch most occasional shoplifters, a broader range of measures are still required for an effective response that can protect profits without impeding sales.

Tags containing alarms

Tags can be equipped with a built-in alarm which sounds when the tag detects tampering or unauthorized removal from the store.  The tag not only triggers the store's electronic article surveillance system, but also sounds an alarm attached to the merchandise.  The local alarm continues to sound for several minutes after leaving the store, attracting attention to the shopper carrying the merchandise.

Installation costs
A single EAS detector, suitable for a small shop, is accessible to all retail stores, and should form a part of any coherent loss or profit protection system.

Disposable tags cost a matter of cents and may have been embedded during manufacture. More sophisticated systems are available, which are more difficult to circumvent. These solutions tend to be product category specific as in the case of high value added electronics and consumables; consequently they are more expensive. Examples are "Safers", transparent secure boxes that completely enclose the article to be protected, Spiders that wrap around packaging and Electronic Merchandise Security Systems that allow phones and tablets to be used securely in the store before purchase. All of these require specific detachers or electronic keys at the point-of-sale desk. They have the advantages of being reusable, strong visual deterrents to potential theft.

Tag orientation
Except for microwave, the detection rate for all these tags depends on their orientation relative to the detection loops. For a pair of planar loops forming a Helmholtz coil, magnetic field lines will be approximately parallel in their center. Orienting the tag so that no magnetic flux from the coils crosses them will prevent detection, as the tag won't be coupled to the coils. This shortcoming, documented in the first EAS patents, can be solved by using multiple coils or by placing them in another arrangement such as a figure-of-eight. Sensitivity will still be orientation-dependent but detection will be possible at all orientations.

Detaching
A detacher is used to remove re-usable hard tags. The type of detacher used will depend on the type of tag. There are a variety of detachers available, with the majority using powerful magnets. Any store that uses an anti-shoplifting system and has a detacher should take care to keep it secured such that it cannot be removed. Some detachers actually have security tags inside them, to alert store personnel of them being removed from (or being brought into) the store. With increasing prevalence, stores have metal detectors at the entrance that can warn against the presence of booster bags or detachers.

Electro-magnetic activation and deactivation
Deactivation of magnetic tags is achieved by straightforward magnetization using a strong magnet. Magneto-acoustic tags require demagnetization. However, sticking a powerful magnet on them will bias disposable magnetic tags and prevent resonance in magneto-acoustic tags. Similarly, sticking a piece of metal, such as a large coin on a disposable radio-frequency tag will shield it. Non-disposable tags require stronger magnets or pieces of metal to disable or shield since the strips are inside the casing and thus further away. Deactivation of some EAS tags can trigger signals sent to the cashier alerting them.

Shielding
Most systems can be circumvented by placing the tagged goods in a bag lined with aluminum foil. The booster bag will act as a Faraday cage, shielding the tags from the antennas. Although some vendors claim that their acousto-magnetic systems cannot be defeated by bags shielded with aluminum foil, a sufficient amount of shielding (in the order of 30 layers of standard 20 μm foil) will defeat all standard systems.

Although the amount of shielding required depends on the system, its sensitivity, and the distance and orientation of the tags relative to its antennas, total enclosure of tags is not strictly necessary. Indeed, some shoplifters use clothes lined with aluminum foil. Low-frequency magnetic systems will require more shielding than radio-frequency systems due to their use of near-field magnetic coupling. Magnetic shielding, with steel or mu-metal, would be more effective, but also cumbersome and expensive.

The shielding technique is well known amongst shoplifters and store owners. Some countries have specific laws against it. In any case, possession of such a bag demonstrates a prior-intent to commit a crime, which in many jurisdictions raises shoplifting from misdemeanor to felony status, because they are considered a "burglary tool."

To deter the use of booster bags, some stores have add-on metal detector systems which sense metallic surfaces.

Jamming
Like most systems that rely on transmission of electromagnetic signals through a hostile medium, EAS sensors can be rendered inoperative by jamming. As the signals from tags are very low-power (their cross-section is small, and the exits are wide), jamming requires little power. Evidently, shoplifters will not feel the need to follow radio transmission regulations; hence crude, easy-to-build transmitters will be adequate for them. However, due to their high frequency of operation, building a jammer can be difficult for microwave circuits; these systems are therefore less likely to be jammed. Although jamming is easy to perform, it is also easy to detect. A simple firmware upgrade should be adequate for modern DSP-based EAS systems to detect jamming. Nevertheless, the vast majority of EAS systems do not currently detect it.

Interference and health issues
All electronic article surveillance systems emit electromagnetic energy and thus can interfere with electronics.

Magneto-harmonic systems need to bring the tags to magnetic saturation and thus create magnetic fields strong enough to be felt through a small magnet. They routinely interfere with CRT displays. Demagnetization-remagnetization units also create intense fields.

Acousto-magnetic systems use less power but their signals are pulsed in the 100 Hz range.

Radio-frequency systems tend to be the least interfering because of their lower power and operating frequency in the MHz range, making it easy to shield against them.

A March 2007 study by the Mayo Clinic in Rochester, Minnesota reported instances where acousto-magnetic EAS systems located at the front of retail stores caused a pacemaker to fail and a defibrillator to trigger, shocking the persons in which they were implanted.

There are also concerns that some installations are intentionally reconfigured to exceed the rated specifications by the manufacturer, thereby exceeding tested and certified magnetic field levels.

See also
Active packaging
Radio-frequency identification
Barkhausen effect
Tattle-Tape
Evaluation of binary classifiers

References

External links
HowStuffWorks: 
 EAS Security System
Retail processes and techniques
Theft
Security
American inventions
Wireless locating
Automatic identification and data capture
Packaging
Retailing-related crime